22 vs. Earth is a 2021 American computer animated short film produced by Pixar Animation Studios. Directed by Kevin Nolting and written by Josh Cooley, the short stars 22, a character who originated in the 2020 Pixar feature film Soul, as she forms a short-lived rebel alliance to stop souls from reaching Earth. It was released on Disney+ on April 30, 2021.

Plot
Prior to the events of Soul, 22 unsuccessfully attempts to dissuade a fellow soul from leaving the Great Before and going to Earth. Resenting Earth for taking away every friend she has ever had, 22 decides to abduct five souls and indoctrinate them into a secret resistance movement called the APOCALYPSE (Anonymous Provocateurs and Other Culprits that are Against Leaving Your friends to go to Pathetic Stupid Earth).

To stop others from finding their inspiration, 22 leads the other five souls (whom she nicknames Macaroni, Zimmy, Peanut, D-Pac, and Moonbeam), but her recruits quickly find theirs and leave for Earth. Soon the only remaining recruit is Macaroni, who gives 22 a hug as her only remaining friend, but their devotion completes their inspiration; 22 angrily throws Macaroni to Earth, vowing that Earth will never take her like it has taken her friends.

The two soul counselors observe 22 and wonder when she will go to Earth and discover the meaning of life. One of them asks what that meaning is, but the other's response is cut off by the closing credits.

Cast
Tina Fey as 22
Alice Braga and Richard Ayoade as two soul counselors in the Great Before who are each named Jerry
Juliana Alcorn as New Soul
Micah Chen as Moonbeam
Adela Drabek as Peanut
Aiyanna Miorin as Zimmy
Karee Ducharme as Macaroni
Samantha Ho as D-Pac
Azriel Dalman as Neptune
Angelica Pascoe (voice)

Production
According to 22 vs. Earth director Kevin Nolting, who also served as the editor for Soul, the short was created to provide an explanation for why 22 did not want to go to Earth. He defined the short film by saying, "if we were making a movie about her, [22 vs. Earth] would be the mid-point and Soul would be the third act". Soul director Pete Docter instructed Nolting to make the short "more kid-friendly" than what Nolting was used to making.

Reception
Gray Houser of Monorail News praised the short, calling it "laugh out loud" and "perfect", while seeing potential for a series of short films following 22 in the Great Before. Jinal Bhatt of Hauterrfly awarded the film four out of five stars, calling it "a nice little insight into why 22 is a loner and despises Earth so much". Tanzim Pardiwalla of Mashable rated the film 3.5/5, saying that while the short did not answer many questions, it was a welcome addition to Soul.

References

External links

2020s American animated films
2020s animated short films
2021 comedy films
2021 computer-animated films
2021 films
Disney+ original films
Existentialist films
Pixar short films
2021 short films
Films scored by Atticus Ross
Films scored by Trent Reznor
2020s English-language films